Faithfully Yours is a 2022 Dutch thriller film directed by André van Duren. The film won the Golden Film award after having sold 100,000 tickets. Bracha van Doesburgh and Elise Schaap play lead roles in the film.

Principal photography began in April 2022.

References

External links 
 

2022 films
2020s Dutch-language films
2022 thriller films
Dutch thriller films
Films directed by André van Duren